She Left Me is the second single from British band Go:Audio, taken from the forthcoming album Made Up Stories.

During July 2008, the music video was added to Kerrang!, Scuzz, The Hits and Fizz television stations. The song narrowly missed out on the official UK Top 40, peaking at #41.

Music video
Whilst the band are performing the song, the music video shows a boy who was recently left by his girlfriend and he is then doing activities by himself; for example playing ping-pong, throwing a frisbee and dancing. However at the end of the video he is making out with another girl. The video has attracted more than 1.5 million hits on YouTube.

The video features Nick Tsang as the fill-in guitarist because whilst the video was being made, the then current guitarist Zack Wilkinson had broken his knee (Zack does not also feature in the video for Made Up Stories). Zack left Go:Audio in September 2009 and Nick then took his spot in the band but Nick does appear in any more music videos as the band split up two months later.

Track listing

CD Single
 She Left Me
 Doesn't Really Matter

7" Vinyl Bundle 1
 She Left Me
 Raise Your Glass (Acoustic Demo)

7" Vinyl Bundle 2 (Picture Disc)
 She Left Me
 Made Up Stories (Live at Shepherds Bush Empire)

References

2008 singles
2008 songs
Epic Records singles